Jan Dam may refer to:

Jan Dam (footballer) (born 1968), Faroese footballer
Jan Dam (boxer) (1905–1985), Dutch boxer